Maria Elizabeth Ender, better known as Mariska Veres (1 October 1947 – 2 December 2006), was a Dutch singer who was best known as the lead singer of the rock group Shocking Blue. Described as being similar to a young Cher, she was known for her sultry voice, eccentric performances, and her striking appearance which featured kohl-rimmed eyes, high cheekbones, and long jet black hair, which was actually a wig.

Biography

Family 
Veres was born in The Hague, in the Netherlands. Her father was the Hungarian Romani violinist Lajos Veres (1912–1981), and her mother Maria Ender (1912–1986) was of French and Russian heritage.

Singing career 

Veres began her career as a singer in 1963 with the guitar band Les Mysteres. In 1964 the band recorded an EP (GTB-label, 10 copies only) with Veres singing on side 1: "Summertime" (solo) and "Someone" (a duet). In 2010 the EP was re-released by record club Platenclub Utrecht (PLUT 009). In 1965, she sang with the Bumble Bees, and then with the Blue Fighters, Danny and his Favourites and General Four. Later in 1966 she sang with the Motowns with whom she also played organ.

In 1968, she was invited to join Shocking Blue to replace lead singer Fred de Wilde, who had to join the army. In 1969/1970 Shocking Blue gained worldwide fame with the hit single "Venus". The month of their arrival in the United States gossip columnist Earl Wilson referred to Veres as a 'beautiful busty girl'. 

When Shocking Blue split up on 1 June 1974, Veres continued in a solo career. Her singles "Take Me High" (1975) and "Lovin' You" (1976) were popular mainly in the Netherlands, Belgium, and Germany. She also released the singles "Tell It Like It Is" (1975), a cover version of Dusty Springfield's "Little By Little" (1976), and "Too Young" (1978).

Shocking Blue reunited in 1984. This comeback turned out to be successful, but one of the other original members, Robbie van Leeuwen, stepped back from the group, partly because he had moved to Luxembourg but also due to the success of Bananarama's cover of "Venus".

Veres started the jazz group The Shocking Jazz Quintet in 1993, and recorded an album (Shocking You) with pop songs from the 1960s and 1970s, now in a jazz version. From 1993 to 2006 she performed in yet another reincarnation of Shocking Blue (recorded the songs Body and Soul and Angel, both produced by former member Robbie van Leeuwen), and also recorded an album with Andrei Serban in 2003, named Gipsy Heart, going back to her Romani roots.

A version of "Venus" was posthumously released in 2007, a few months after her death, recorded with pianist/bandleader Dolf de Vries (on the album Another Touch). Veres recorded "Venus" four times: with "Shocking Blue" (1969), with the "Mariska Veres Shocking Jazz Quintet" (1993), with "Formula Diablo" (in English/Spanish, 1997), and with "Dolf de Vries" (a lounge version of "Venus", 2005–2006).

Personal life and death 
Veres had a long-term relationship with guitarist , but never married or had children. Reminiscing to the Belgian magazine Flair, she remarked about her early fame: "I was just a painted doll (back in those days), nobody could ever reach me. Nowadays, I am more open to people". 

Veres died of gallbladder cancer on 2 December 2006 at age 59, just three weeks after the disease had been detected.

Discography

Solo singles
1975 "Take Me High/I Am Loving You" (Pink Elephant, Polydor, Decca)
1976 "Tell It Like It Is/Wait Till' I Get Back to You" (Pink Elephant, Polydor)
1976 "Loving You/You Showed Me How" (Pink Elephant)
1977 "Little by Little/Help the Country" (Pink Elephant)
1978 "Too Young/You Don't Have to Know" (Seramble)
1978 "Bye Bye to Romance/It's a Long Hard Road" (CNR)
1980 "Looking Out for Number One/So Sad Without You" (CNR)
1982 "Wake Up City/In the Name of Love" (EMI Records)

Albums
1993 Shocking You (Red Bullet), album by Mariska Veres Shocking Jazz Quintet
2003 Gipsy Heart (Red Bullet), album by Mariska Veres & Ensemble Andrei Serban

References

External links

 
 

1947 births
2006 deaths
Deaths from cancer in the Netherlands
Dutch contraltos
Dutch people of French descent
Dutch people of Hungarian descent
Dutch people of Russian descent
Dutch Romani people
English-language singers from the Netherlands
Women rock singers
Musicians from The Hague
People of Hungarian-Romani descent
Romani singers
20th-century Dutch women singers
21st-century Dutch women singers
21st-century Dutch singers
Deaths from gallbladder cancer